Merely Players may refer to:
 Merely Players (play), a one-man stage show written and performed by Barry Morse
 Merely Players (film), a lost 1918 silent film drama
 "...merely Players", part of the Shakespeare monologue All the world's a stage